The United States International Gulls men's ice hockey program represented United States International University in college ice hockey at the NCAA Division I level during the 1980s.

History
In 1978 Ph.D candidate Maynard Howe, the former head coach of Maine at Portland–Gorham, put together the first hockey team for the University and, with the support of University President Dr. William Rust, the team was soon sponsored as a Division I program. The Gulls charged out of the gate, winning 24 games in their first season of NCAA play but they could not keep that pace. USIU produced just 8 wins the following year (albeit in 21 games) and, after surging back with an 18-win year in 1982, the program put up losing records three straight seasons before Howe was replaced by former Minnesota head coach Brad Buetow. The new coach coincided with U.S. International forming the Great West Hockey Conference with Alaska–Anchorage, Alaska–Fairbanks and Northern Arizona.

In Buetow's first season he got the Gulls back on their winning ways, producing a 20 win season and winning the inaugural conference championship. After a mediocre second season the Gulls returned in force in 1987–88, winning 23 games and being a finalist for the last at-large bid to the 1988 NCAA Division I Men's Ice Hockey Tournament. 1988 was the last hurrah for the program, however. After Northern Arizona couldn't continue after their first season in the conference, USIU had only the Alaska schools as conference partners and travelling to the largest state was just as prohibitively as expensive as anywhere else in the country. The university had tried to induce several nearby schools to begin their own ice hockey programs, including USC, UCLA and Arizona but after three years the school was no longer able to financially support the program and it was shuttered.

Season-by-season results
Source:

Footnotes

Olympians
This is a list of United States International alumni were a part of an Olympic team.

Gulls in the NHL

References

United States International University